7 series or 7-series may refer to:

 AMD 700 chipset series
 BMW 7 Series
 Boeing 7x7 series
 GeForce 7 Series
 Volvo 700 Series
 Windows Phone, formerly known as Windows Phone 7 Series
 IRB Sevens World Series
 7 Series (EP), an EP by Kid Ink

See also

 1 series (disambiguation)